Asia's world cup qualifiers will be centred on its flagship tournament, the Asian Five Nations. The winner of the 2010 tournament will qualify, but to give all teams a chance of qualification the 2008 and 2009 seasons will also be part of the qualification process. In total, 13 teams participated in the qualifying tournament, as in 2007, with 12 of the teams being the same (Guam competed in 2007, but were replaced by Pakistan in the 2011 qualification process).

Round 1

Due to the nature of the qualifying process, 2008 was the only year that a Division Two nation could continue in the process to qualify for 2011 Rugby World Cup. Since the winner of the 2010 Asian Five Nations will be Asia's representative, there would not be enough time for any team competing in or below Division Two after 2008 to reach the top division in time, rendering them effectively eliminated. The tournament was played in June 2008 in Bangkok, Thailand and was won by the hosts who were promoted, thus continuing their qualification hopes.  The last place team from Division One was to face relegation to Division Two for 2009, effectively eliminating them from qualification as well. China was unable to compete in Division One due to visa complications and they were relegated to Division Two, last placed Sri Lanka stayed up.

Round 2

Due to the nature of the qualifying process, 2009 was the last chance that a Division One nation could continue in the process to qualify for the 2011 Rugby World Cup.  Since the winner of the 2010 Asian Five Nations will be Asia's representative, any team competing in Division One after 2009 will be effectively eliminated.  The last place team from the 2009 Asian Five Nations Top Five, Singapore, was relegated to Division One, eliminating them from qualification.  The Arabian Gulf team won the 2009 Division One tournament on April 11 to earn promotion to the 2010 Asian Five Nations Top Five and remain in contention for qualification to the 2011 Rugby World Cup.

Round 3

The winner of this tournament, Japan, qualified for the Pool A of the 2011 Rugby World Cup, where they faced New Zealand, France, Tonga, and Canada.  Kazakhstan, the runner up advanced to the semifinal of the 20th Place Playoff to face Uruguay.

Fixtures

External links

Official Website

2011
Asia
2008 in Asian rugby union
2009 in Asian rugby union
2010 in Asian rugby union